Corytophanidae is a family of iguanian lizards, also called casquehead lizards or helmeted lizards, endemic to the New World. Nine species of casquehead lizards from three genera are recognized.

Geographic range
Corytophanids are found from Mexico, through Central America, and as far south as Ecuador.

Certain species are now extant in South Florida and are considered invasive.

Description
The casquehead lizards are moderately sized lizards, with laterally compressed bodies, and typically have well-developed head crests in the shape of a casque helmet. This crest is a sexually dimorphic characteristic in males of Basiliscus, but is present in both sexes of Corytophanes and Laemanctus.
In past years there has been evidence of corytophanids in the Eocene of North America. The greatest percentage of omnivorous species (> 10% plant diet), over 30% in each, and the highest mean percentage of plant matter in the diet are corytophanids.

Behavior
In Corytophanes, the head crests are used in defensive displays, where the lateral aspect of the body is brought about to face a potential predator in an effort to look bigger. Unlike many of their close relatives, they are unable to break off their tails when captured, probably because the tail is essential as a counterbalance during rapid movement.

Habitat
Casquehead lizards are forest-dwelling. All corytophanids are excellent climbers, and they are usually found in trees or low bushes.

Reproduction
Despite the small number of species in the family Corytophanidae, it includes both egg-laying species and species that give birth to live young.

Genera and species
Family Corytophanidae
Genus Basiliscus
Basiliscus basiliscus  — common basilisk
Basiliscus galeritus  — red-headed basilisk, western basilisk
Basiliscus plumifrons   — green basilisk, plumed basilisk 
Basiliscus vittatus  — brown basilisk, striped basilisk
Genus Corytophanes
Corytophanes cristatus  — helmeted iguana
Corytophanes hernandesii  — Hernandez's helmeted basilisk
Corytophanes percarinatus  — Guatemalan helmeted basilisk
 Genus Laemanctus
Laemanctus julioi 
Laemanctus longipes  — eastern casquehead iguana
Laemanctus serratus  — serrated casquehead iguana
Laemanctus waltersi 

Nota bene: In the following lists, a binomial authority in parentheses indicates that the species was originally described in a different genus.

References

Further reading
Fitzinger L (1843). Systema Reptilium, Fasciculus Primus, Amblyglossae. Vienna: Braumüller & Seidel. 106 pp. + indices. (Family Corythophanae, p. 52). (in Latin).
Pough FH, Andrews RM, Cadle JE, Crump ML, Savitsky AH, Wells KD (2003). Herpetology, Third Edition. Upper Saddle River, New Jersey: Pearson Education, Inc. 736 pp. . (Corytophanidae, p. 129).

 
Lizard families
Taxa named by Leopold Fitzinger
Extant Eocene first appearances